Apoorva or Apurva may refer to:

 Apurva, the performative element of an injunction that justifies ritualistic acts and their results in Vedanta philosophy
 Apoorva (given name), an Indian given name (including a list of persons with the name)
 Apoorva (2016 film), a  Kannada film directed by Ravichandran

See also